Folliculin-interacting protein 1 (FNIP1) functions as a co-chaperone which inhibits the ATPase activity of the chaperone Hsp90 (heat shock protein-90) and decelerates its chaperone cycle. FNIP1 acts as a scaffold to load FLCN onto Hsp90. FNIP1 is also involved in chaperoning of both kinase and non-kinase clients.

Co-chaperone function 

FNIP1 does not have any known functional domains; however, based on amino acid sequence alignments, conserved regions were identified and named as A–D. The C-terminal domain of FNIP1 (amino acids 929–1,166 or fragment D) preferentially interacts with the middle domain of Hsp90. This fragment and the full-length FNIP1 are potent inhibitors/decelerator of Hsp90 ATPase activity. Small-molecule inhibitors that target the nucleotide-binding pocket of the N-terminal domain of Hsp90 also inhibit its ATPase activity and lead to degradation of the client proteins. However, FNIP1-mediated inhibition of Hsp90 ATPase activity appears to decelerate the chaperone cycle, not inhibit it completely, as overexpression of FNIP1 stabilizes and activates client proteins. This can also be reversed by the co-chaperone Aha1, which is the activator of the Hsp90 ATPase function and competes with FNIP1 for binding to Hsp90.

Post-translational regulation  

Casein-kinase-2 mediated sequential phosphorylation of the co-chaperone FNIP1 leads to incremental inhibition of Hsp90 ATPase activity and gradual activation of both kinase and non-kinase clients. O-GlcNAcylation antagonizes phosphorylation of FNIP1, preventing its interaction with Hsp90, and consequently promotes FNIP1 ubiquitination and proteasomal degradation. Post-translational regulation of FNIP1 creates a rheostat for the molecular chaperone Hsp90.

Clinical significance 
Mutation of FNIP1 in mice causes a deficiency of B cells, and cardiomyopathy, with FNIP1 thought to act as a negative regulator of AMPK.

References 

Human proteins